Les Granges-le-Roi is a commune in the Essonne department in Île-de-France in northern France.

Inhabitants of Les Granges-le-Roi are known as Grangeois.

See also
Communes of the Essonne department

References

External links

Land use (IAURIF) 
Mayors of Essonne Association 

Communes of Essonne